Adventure Cyclist is an association magazine published nine times annually by Adventure Cycling Association in Missoula, Montana.

History
Adventure Cycling, then called Bikecentennial, published a newsletter called BikeReport beginning in 1974. In 1975 it was established as a magazine. It was redesigned as a newsprint tabloid in 1978 and published six times annually until 1985, when it was increased to nine annual issues. BikeReport changed its name to Adventure Cyclist for the April 1994 issue. The magazine underwent further redesigns in 1998 and again in 2013.

In November 2015 Alex Strickland was named the editor-in-chief of the magazine.

Overview
Adventure Cyclist publishes stories, photos, and essays about bicycle travel in the U.S. and around the world. They also publish bike and gear reviews, technical articles, and guides. The magazine's current circulation is about 50,000. According to the magazine's latest (2015) U. S. Postal Service form PS-3500, the number of hardcopy issues mailed to paid subscribers is about 27,000.

Open Road Gallery
A recurring piece in the magazine, the Open Road Gallery features photos by Greg Siple, cofounder of Adventure Cycling, of bicycle travelers who visit the Missoula headquarters.

References

External links
 Official website

Bimonthly magazines published in the United States
Sports magazines published in the United States
Magazines published in Montana
Mass media in Missoula, Montana
Magazines established in 1975
1975 establishments in Montana